Edolo (Etoro) is a Papuan language of Papua New Guinea, spoken by the Etoro people. 60% of speakers are monolingual.

References 

Bosavi languages
Languages of Southern Highlands Province
Languages of Western Province (Papua New Guinea)